Roberto Tola (born August 5, 1966) is an Italian jazz guitarist and composer.

Biography 

Tola began studying music when he was just six years old. In 1976 studies cello in the Conservatory of Music in Sassari. Four years later continues his studies of Modern and Jazz Guitar and in 1983 established a sextet named Jazzmania. For this band Tola composed and arranged the album Preludio in 1985. From 1989 Tola was in the Italian Blue Note Orchestra, then from 1991 to 2012 he was the guitarist of the OJS big band (the Sardinia Jazz Orchestra).

In 2005 he served as the conductor of the 26-member orchestra for the national competition "Canzonissima 2000".

Meantime he collaborates with many others artists and bands, as the conductors Colin Towns, Carla Bley, Giorgio Gaslini, Giancarlo Gazzani, Bruno Tommaso, Mario Raja, Marco Tiso and Roberto Pregadio; the famous singer Jill Saward, Norma Winstone, David Linx and the famous Italian jazz singer Gegè Telesforo. The trumpetists Flavio Boltro, Giovanni Amato, Paolo Fresu, Enrico Rava and magic Tom Harrell; the Bassist Steve Swallow, the drummer Billy Cobham, Saxes Bob Mintzer (member of Yellowjackets), Eric Marienthal, Najee, Paul Taylor, Paula Atherton, Andy Sheppard, Javier Girotto, Maurizio Gianmarco; the pianist Scott Wilkie, Riccardo Zegna, accordionist and pianist Antonello Salis,   accordionist Richard Galliano and others else.

Has been teaching music, modern and jazz guitar in several Italian music schools for more than 20 years.

In 2014 collaborates for the album On The Corner by the English jazz-funk band Shakatak.in 2016 together with English jazz musicians, as Mornington Lockett, Derek Nash, George Anderson, appears in the album Endless Summer and also in the single "M is for Manhattan" by the English singer Jill Saward.

In May 2017 Tola released his first solo album titled Bein' Green. recorded in Sardinia (Italy), Spain, UK and US. The album features some world-class musicians, including Bob Mintzer, Najee, Bill McGee, Jill Saward, Bill Sharpe and Tim Collins.

In September 2017 the album Bein' Green was awarded with the Silver Medal at the Global Music Awards, in the Jazz Music and Best Album categories.

In November 2017 Tola attended the 8th Annual Hollywood Music in Media Awards held in The Avalon in Los Angeles, as nominee for the Jazz Category for the outstanding achievement of his single "Sunny Morning" from the album Bein' Green.

Again in November 2017, Roberto Tola is the Best Jazz Artist 2017 and his song "Sunny Morning" is the Best Jazz Song of the Year for the Radio Music Awards, a radio network competition conceived and powered by the Indie Music Channel association.

In March 2018 Tola was honoured with the Vox Pop Award during the 16th Annual Independent Music Awards at the Lincoln Center in New York, for his song "Funky Party" in the Jazz Instrumental Song Category. The awarded song also features the famous saxophonist Bob Mintzer and keyboardist Bill Sharpe.

In April 2018 the Indie Music Channel Awards association honoured Roberto Tola with seven Awards, corresponding to the following categories: the Best Jazz Song with the song "Flying Away", Best Jazz Recording with "Tears for Niro",  Best Jazz Instrumentalist for "Funky Party", Best Jazz Producer with "Cabriolet", and also Best Recording of the Year with the song "Tears For Niro" and Best New Male Artist of the Year.

In September 2018, the Hollywood Music in Media Awards, the prestigious musical contest, early held in the famous The Avalon in Hollywood, nominated Roberto Tola for the second time (previous one has been in the 2017), with the song Funky Party, in the Jazz Category.

In October 2018, the song Lullaby of Christmas (featuring the trumpeter Bill McGee), composed by Roberto Tola and released in December 2017, has been accepted and nominated by the Recording Academy to the 1st Ballot for the 61st GRAMMY AWARDS nomination.

In 2019 Roberto Tola got three other new nominations for three different music contests: 17th Independent Music Awards, with his single Lullaby of Christmas (feat. Bill McGee) in the Instrumental Category; 2nd Atlas Elite Entertainment Music Awards with the single Slow Motion (feat. the American singer Darryl F. Walker) in the Jazz Category; One World Music Awards with the CD Album BEIN' GREEN for the Best Jazz Album

Meanwhile, the artist continues to compose, record and tour all around the world.

In almost four decades of musical career, he has participated in hundreds of concerts and dozens of festivals in Italy, Europe up to the Far East to China, among which are: Smooth Hot Jazz (Madrid - Spain), Festival "Jazz del Mediterranei"(Valencia - Spain) and Spain Tour 2004, several participations at the "Time in Jazz" International Festival (Berchidda - Italy), multiple participations in the "Writing in Jazz" (Sassari - Italy), Jazz Op (Udine - Italy), Bergamo Jazz Festival (Italy), Vivere Jazz Festival (Fiesole - Italy), participation in various editions of the Nuoro Jazz Seminars (Nuoro - Italy), China Tour 2001 (China), Sant'Anna Arresi Jazz Festival 1996 (Italy), Fiera della Musica (Ferrara - Italy), Estiamo in Piazza Festival (Ozieri - Italy), and many others.

Roberto Tola boasts many collaborations with some of the most prestigious international artists of the Music history, including: Bob Mintzer, Carla Bley, Tom Harrell, Norma Winstone, Steve Swallow, Richard Galliano, and also Javier Girotto, Giorgio Gaslini, Giancarlo Gazzani, Bruno Tommaso, Roberto Pregadio, Jill Saward, David Linx, Gegè Telesforo, Michael Lington, Paul Taylor, Paula Atherton, Najee, Bill Sharpe, Rocco Ventrella, Andy Sheppard, Maurizio Gianmarco, Flavio Boltro, Giovanni Amato, Paolo Fresu, Enrico Rava, Antonello Salis and more..

Discography

As leader 

 2022: Says (single - EBM)
 2022: Sunny Morning (Summer Party) - new special version, remixed and remastered (single - EBM)
 2022: Sun Kiss (single - EBM)
 2021: A Christmas Ago (single - EBM)
 2021: Kon Tiki - feat. Billy Cobham, Eric Marienthal, Scott Wilkie, Andrea Tofanelli  (album - EBM)
 2021: Tiana - feat. Eric Marienthal (single - EBM)
 2020: Colors - feat. Michael Lington, Paula Atherton, Rocco Ventrella, Bill McGee, Darryl Walker, Mando Cordova (album - RT Music)
 2018: Slow Motion (single - RT Music)
 2018: Sunny Morning - feat. Bill Sharpe, Jill Saward (single - RT Music)
 2017: Lullaby of Christmas (single - RT Music)
 2017: Bein' Green - feat. Bob Mintzer, Najee, Jill Saward, Bill Sharpe, Bill McGee, Tim Collins (album RT Music)

As sideman 

 2014: Shakatak - On the Corner (Album, JVC)
 2016: Jill Saward - "M Is For Manhattan" (Single, Secret Records)
 2016: Jill Saward - Endless Summer (Album, Secret Records)
 2020: Rocco Ventrella - "Feeling the Breeze" (Single, Delilah Records)

With Orchestra Jazz della Sardegna 

 Scrivere in Jazz (Flex Records, 1996)
 Sacred Concert Jazz Te Deum (Soul Note, 2002)
 Blau (Wide Sound, 2004)
 Il Brutto Anatroccolo (Il Manifesto, CD 2005)
 Il Brutto Anatroccolo - Live at "Time in Jazz" Festival (Time in Jazz, 2008)

Videos 
 2006: I Am the Walrus - with Colin Towns and OJS (RT Music)
 2017: Sunny Morning (RT Music)

Awards and nominations

Bibliography and further reading 
 2002: Time in Jazz - Various Authors (publisher: Taphros)
 2003: Boghes e Sonos - Giacomo Serreli (publisher: Scuola Sarda, 2003 - 870 pages)
 2011: Time After Time - Vincenzo Martorella (publisher: Magnum edizioni, 2011)
 2020 - Vintage - Riccardo Frau (publisher: Alfa Editrice, 2020)

References

External links
 Roberto Tola official web site ( robertotola.com )
 Robert Tola at AllMusic
 Robert Tola at AllAboutJazz
 Orchestra Jazz della Sardegna official web site
 Roberto Tola at Discogs

1966 births
Living people
Italian male conductors (music)
Italian jazz guitarists
Italian male composers
Italian music educators
21st-century Italian conductors (music)
21st-century Italian male musicians
Male jazz musicians